Erronea adusta, common name the chocolate beauty or tanned/dark onyx cowry, is a species of sea snail, a cowry, a marine gastropod mollusk in the family Cypraeidae, the cowries. This species was formerly regarded as a subspecies of the onyx cowry (Erronea onyx).

Description
The shells of these cowries reach on average  of length. The dorsum surface of Erronea adusta is smooth, shiny and generally dark brown. The base is also dark brown, usually with orange teeth. The interior of the shell is pale purple.

Distribution
This species occurs in the Indian Ocean along East Africa (mainly Kenya, Mascarene, Mauritius and Tanzania).

Habitat
Erronea adusta lives in the tropical and subtropical zones, in shallow subtidal water.

References

 Verdcourt, B. (1954). The cowries of the East African Coast (Kenya, Tanganyika, Zanzibar and Pemba). Journal of the East Africa Natural History Society 22(4) 96: 129-144, 17 pls.
 Burgess, C.M. (1970). The Living Cowries. A. S. Barnes and Co, Ltd. Cranbury, New Jersey

External links
 Biolib
 WoRMS
 Erronea adusta on flmnh.ufl.edu 
 
 Erronea succinta adusta

adusta
Gastropods described in 1810